Nicoletta Machiavelli (1 August 1944 – 15 November 2015) was an  Italian film actress, also known as Nicoletta Rangoni Machiavelli and Nicoletta Macchiavelli.

Life and career
The daughter of a Florentine father and of an American mother, Machiavelli was a descendant of the philosopher and author Niccolò Machiavelli. She studied painting at the Accademia di Belle Arti di Firenze.

Following an audition for the role of Eva in John Huston's The Bible: In the Beginning..., she was noted by the producer Dino De Laurentiis who put her under contract for seven years, a contract she eventually broke after three years.

Her first role was Ugo Tognazzi's wife in A Question of Honour, and following a few comedies, her early career was characterized by genre films, mainly Spaghetti Western, notably Sergio Corbucci's Navajo Joe.

Starting from the late 1960s Machiavelli started appearing in more ambitious art films, working with Hans-Jürgen Syberberg, Pietro Germi, Dino Risi, Sergio Citti, Andrzej Żuławski, and Liliana Cavani, among others.

In 1984, Machiavelli became a disciple of Osho and retired from show business. She eventually moved to Seattle, Washington, where among other things she taught Italian at the Bellevue College and at the University of Washington. She died of an undisclosed illness on 15 November 2015, aged 71.

Selected filmography

 Thrilling (1965)
 A Question of Honour (1966) – Domenicangela Piras
 I nostri mariti (1966) – Roberta (segment "Il Marito di Roberta")
 Kiss the Girls and Make Them Die (1966) – Sylvia
 The Hills Run Red (1966) – Mary Ann
 Navajo Joe (1966) – Estella – Mrs. Lynne's maid
 Matchless (1967) – Tipsy
 Anyone Can Play (1968)
 A Minute to Pray, a Second to Die (1968) – Laurinda
 Garter Colt (1968) – Lulu 'Garter' Colt
 Hate Thy Neighbor (1968) – Peggy Savalas
 Candy (1968) – Marquita
 Scarabea: How Much Land Does a Man Need? (1969) – Scarabea
 Temptation (1970) – Carla Veraldi
 A Noose for Django (1969) – Maya
 Monte Carlo or Bust! (1969) – Dominique
 Carnal Circuit (1969) – Luisa Lamberti
 It Takes a Thief, ep. "Who'll Bid Two Million Dollars?" (1969) – Varina
 The Ravine (1969) – Anja Kovach
 Necropolis (1970)
 A Pocketful of Chestnuts (1970) – Teresa
 Lover of the Great Bear (1971) – Leonia
 The Policeman (1971)
 Man with the Transplanted Brain (1971) – Héléna
 Dirty Weekend (1973) – Sylva
 Tony Arzenta (1973) – Anna – wife of Tony
 La coppia (1973)
 Bawdy Tales (1973) – Duchessa Caterina di Ronciglione
 Die merkwürdige Lebensgeschichte des Friedrich Freiherrn von der Trenck  (1973) – Amalie – sister of Frederick the Great
 Icy Breasts (1974) – Mrs. Rilson
 That Most Important Thing: Love (1975) – Luce, la femme de Lapade
 Malicious Pleasure (1975) – Melisa
 L'Année sainte (1976) – Carla, la terroriste
 Free Hand for a Tough Cop (1976) – Mara
 Beyond Good and Evil (1977) – Amanda
 La fuite en avant (1983) – Fiama (final film role)

References

External links

 
 Actress Machiavelli Now Star Teacher, bellevuecollege.edu; accessed 19 November 2015.

1944 births
2015 deaths
20th-century Italian actresses
American film actresses
American women academics
Italian emigrants to the United States
Italian film actresses
Italian women academics
Spaghetti Western actresses
Accademia di Belle Arti di Firenze alumni
Italian people of American descent
21st-century American women